The event was being held for the first time since 1974.

Victor Amaya won the title, defeating Brian Teacher 6–1, 6–4 in the final.

Seeds

Draw

Finals

Top half

Section 1

Section 2

Bottom half

Section 3

Section 4

External links
 Singles draw

Next Generation Adelaide International
Singles
Marlboro South Australian Men's Tennis Classic – Singles
Marlboro South Australian Men's Tennis Classic – Singles